Przemko II of Opava (( – 16 June 1478) was a member of the Opava branch of the Přemyslid dynasty. He was Duke of Opava from 1433 until his death. From 1466, he was also a member of the cathedral chapter of Wrocław. In older literature, he is sometimes confused with his nephew Przemko III.

Life 
Przemko II's parents were Duke Przemko I of Opava and his third wife, Helena of Bosnia (who died on 2 March 1435).

After Przemko I's death in 1433, his eldest son, Wenceslas II, took up the guardianship of his three younger half-brothers William, Ernest and Przemko II.  His second-eldest, Nicholas IV, who had already reached adulthood, was given the Lordship of Zlaté Hory. Although their father had stipulated in his will that his territory should not be fragmented further, the brothers nevertheless divided their inheritance in 1435. At the time, Przemko II was destined for a career in the clergy, and he probably received no territory in the 1435 division.

Przemko II studied theology at the Universities of Krakow and Vienna. In Vienna, he wrote the astrological treatise . Around 1455, he returned to Wrocław, where he had been a member of the cathedral chapter since 1446. In 1462, he was appointed provost of the Church of the Holy Cross in Wrocław.

In 1464 he got into a dispute with his nephew, John of Opava, about the ownership of Fulnek. In the same year, he had to give up his claim on a share of the Duchy of Opava, because King George of Bohemia had become the sole ruler of the Duchy. Przemko nevertheless continued to use the title Duke of Opava. Around 1465, he became a canon at Wrocław.

After Bishop Jošt of Wrocław died in 1467, Przemko served as diocesan administrator. Although he was considered a likely candidate to succeed Jošt, the post was given to Rudolf of Rüdesheim, who had previously served as papal legate for Germany and Bohemia.

Przemko was a renowned scientist, educated in the fields of theology, astrology and alchemy. He died in 1478, unmarried, and was buried in the Church of the Holy Cross in Wrocław. His tomb has been preserved to this day.

References 
 Rudolf Žáček: Dějiny Slezska v datech, Prague, 2004, p. 438
 Zdeněk Měřínský: Marginálie k životním osudům Přremysla III. Opavského, in: Od Knížat ke Králům, p. 424–425

External links 
 
 https://archive.org/stream/archivfrster41akaduoft/archivfrster41akaduoft_djvu.txt

Footnotes 

Moravian nobility
Medieval Bohemian nobility
Silesian nobility
Opavian Přemyslids
1420s births
1478 deaths
15th-century Polish Roman Catholic priests